Barbara Wirth (born 16 September 1989) is a German former alpine ski racer competing in the FIS Alpine Ski World Cup.

Skiing career
Wirth mainly competed in slalom and giant slalom events. In the 2013/2014 season she qualified for the slalom event at the 2014 Winter Olympics. She was officially nominated by the DOSB on 23 January 2014. She retired in 2016.

References

External links 
 
 
 

1989 births
Living people
Alpine skiers at the 2014 Winter Olympics
Olympic alpine skiers of Germany
German female alpine skiers
Skiers from Munich
21st-century German women